Antti Kalapudas (born 22 July 1996, Oulainen) is a Finnish ice hockey player. He currently plays center for SaiPa of the Liiga. Kalapudas has played at Kajaanin Hokki in Mestis and younger with Oulun Kärpät Juniors. He debuted at Finland's Liiga team against Vienna Capitals presenting in CHL-game, 22 August 2015 in Vienna, Austria.

References

External links
 

1996 births
Living people
Finnish ice hockey forwards
Hokki players
JYP Jyväskylä players
KalPa players
Oulun Kärpät players
SaiPa players
Vaasan Sport players
People from Oulainen
Sportspeople from North Ostrobothnia